Calochilus campestris, commonly known as the copper beard orchid, is a species of orchid endemic to south-eastern Australia. It has a single fleshy, channelled leaf and up to fifteen pale green and red flowers with a purple "beard".

Description
The lateral sepals are a similar length but narrower. The base of the labellum is fleshy and has two smooth, metallic blue plates and the middle part has bristly purple hairs. The column has two sham "eyes" but without a ridge joining them. Flowering occurs from October to November but each flower only lasts between two and four days.

Taxonomy and naming
Calochilus campestris was first formally described in 1810 by Robert Brown and the description was published in Prodromus Florae Novae Hollandiae et Insulae Van Diemen. The specific epithet (campestris) is a Latin word meaning "of or pertaining to fields".

Distribution and habitat
The copper beard orchid grows in a wide range of habitats from heath to montane forest. It is found south from the Blackdown Tableland in Queensland, in coastal New South Wales and as far inland as Temora and is widespread in Victoria. It is only known in Tasmania from a single collection from Clarke Island in 1979 and in South Australia from a single record in the Mount Billy Conservation Park on the Fleurieu Peninsula in 1983.

Conservation
Calochilus campestris is class as "rare" in South Australia and as "endangered" in Tasmania under the Threatened Species Protection Act 1995. The main threats to the species on Clarke Island are land clearing, inappropriate fire regimes and inappropriate grazing regimes.

References

campestris
Endemic orchids of Australia
Orchids of New South Wales
Orchids of Queensland
Orchids of Victoria (Australia)
Orchids of South Australia
Orchids of Tasmania
Plants described in 1810
Taxa named by Robert Brown (botanist, born 1773)